Wars between Russia and Sweden have been recorded since as early as the 12th century. These conflicts include:

See also

 
 
 
 
 
 
 

Russia and Sweden
Russia–Sweden military relations
Russia
Sweden
Wars, Sweden
Wars, Sweden
Wars, Russia
Wars, Russia